Reuben Acquah (born 3 November 1996) is a Ghanaian professional footballer who plays as a defensive midfielder for Teuta.

Career statistics

Honours
Tirana
 Albanian Cup: 2016–17

References

External links
 

1996 births
Living people
Footballers from Accra
Ghanaian footballers
Association football midfielders
Ghanaian expatriate footballers
Expatriate footballers in Belgium
Expatriate footballers in Austria
Expatriate footballers in Albania
Expatriate footballers in Slovakia
Expatriate footballers in Croatia
Ghanaian expatriate sportspeople in Belgium
Ghanaian expatriate sportspeople in Austria
Ghanaian expatriate sportspeople in Albania
Ghanaian expatriate sportspeople in Slovakia
Ghana Premier League players
Kategoria Superiore players
2. Liga (Austria) players
3. Liga (Slovakia) players
Red Bull Ghana players
Liberty Professionals F.C. players
K.V. Mechelen players
LASK players
FC DAC 1904 Dunajská Streda players
KF Tirana players
FC Juniors OÖ players
TSV Hartberg players
SV Ried players
NK Lokomotiva Zagreb players